West Indian cherry is a common name for several plants and may refer to:

Malpighia emarginata
Prunus myrtifolia